Nirvana in Fire is a 2015 Chinese historical drama and thriller based on Hai Yan's book Lang Ya Bang (瑯琊榜). It was directed by Kong Sheng and Li Xue, and stars Hu Ge, Liu Tao and Wang Kai as Mei Changsu, Princess Nihuang and Prince Jing. The series tells the story of Lin Shu, who, under the alias Mei Changsu, enters the capital of Liang to seek justice for a conspiracy that labeled his family as traitors 12 years before. It originally aired two episodes daily on Beijing TV and Dragon TV, Monday through Sunday from 19:30 to 21:00, from September 19 to October 15, 2015.

The drama was a commercial and critical success, surpassing 100 million streaming views by its second day, and receiving a total number of views on iQiyi of over 3.3 billion by the end of the series. Nirvana in Fire was considered a social media phenomenon, generating 3.55 billion posts on Sina Weibo that praised its characters and story-line. As of December 2016, it has a total view of 13 billion views as reported by VLinkage.

The drama was also one of the recipients of the Outstanding Television Drama Award at the Flying Apsaras Awards, the highest government honor given for outstanding achievement in the television industry. Kong Sheng also won the Outstanding Director Award for his work in Nirvana in Fire. In 2016, SARFT recognized the series as one of the top 20 most outstanding dramas of the year. It was also nominated for the Magnolia Award for Best Television Series at the 22nd Shanghai Television Festival.

Its sequel, Nirvana in Fire II: The Wind Blows in Chang Lin, aired from December 2017 to February 2018. In the end of 2020, Daylight Productions announced that a third season is currently in the works.

Synopsis 

In 6th-century China, there was a war between feudal Northern Wei and Southern Liang dynasties. The Liang commander general, Lin Xie, his 19-year-old son, Lin Shu, and the Chiyan Army defeated hostile Wei forces. However, when the Chiyan were weakened from the battle, they were massacred under the Emperor's orders. Unknown to the king, the Chiyan were framed by political rivals, who claimed that they were conspiring a rebellion with the then-crown prince, Prince Qi. As a result, Prince Qi and members of the Lin manor were also unjustly executed. Qi's mother, Consort Chen, and Lin Shu's mother, sister of the king, committed suicide.

Lin Shu survived but was poisoned by the Poison of the Bitter Flame. To save his life, the master of Langya Hall, Lin Chen, gave him a treatment that ultimately led to Lin Shu's altered appearance and weakened state. For the next twelve years, he establishes the Jiang Zuo Alliance and becomes chief of the pugilist world as Mei Changsu. Lin Shu then returns to the capital during the fight for the throne between Prince Yu and Prince Xian. He uses this opportunity to restore his family's innocence as well as secretly help his best friend and cousin, the unfavored Prince Jing, become Emperor.

Under the name Su Zhe, Lin Shu becomes a strategist, who supports Prince Yu on the surface. He helps him take down the Crown Prince and his powerful ally, Marquess Xie Yu. Secretly, he assists Prince Jing as he rises in power and favor. While also investigating Xie Yu, Lin Shu discovers new details in the Chiyan conspiracy. He realizes that Xia Jiang, head of the Xuan Jing Bureau, was the instigator who framed Prince Qi and the Chiyan Army so that Prince Qi could not dissolve the Xuan Jing Bureau when he becomes emperor.

After the Crown Prince falls from grace, Prince Yu and his own strategist, Qin Banruo, become suspicious of Mei Changsu after they see Prince Jing's sudden rise in power. Although he is advised to stop advancing for the throne, Prince Yu forms an alliance with Xia Jiang, who agrees to help him to prevent the Chiyan case from being re-investigated under Prince Jing, for fear that the prince would uncover Xia's lies. Despite their plan to use the capture of Wei Zheng, former Lieutenant of Chiyan Army under Lin Shu, to create bad blood between Prince Jing and his father, the plan backfires, with Xia Jiang arrested and his Bureau seized and searched. Prince Yu's previous crimes are also revealed, causing him to be demoted and put under house arrest. Qin Banruo later persuades him to hold a rebellion while his father is away at the Spring Hunt with Prince Jing and Mei Changsu.

Despite arriving with a more powerful army compared to the small number of soldiers stationed at the Hunt, Prince Yu fails. He later commits suicide in prison. Meanwhile, Xia Jiang escapes prison during the rebellion attempt and deduces that Mei Changsu is Lin Shu. He attempts to regain the Emperor's trust by uncovering Mei's identity and accusing Prince Jing of conspiring with the strategist as the reason for the prince's quick rise in power. Although the Emperor imprisons Xia Jiang again, he attempts to kill Mei Changsu to prevent further messes, but is stopped by Prince Jing.

Together, Prince Jing and Mei Changsu plan for the reopening of the Chiyan case. At the Emperor's birthday celebration, the Prince has Grand Princess Liyang, the wife of Xie Yu, bring up the case in front of the emperor with evidence from Xie Yu's confession. Although angered by the sudden accusation of his mistakes, the Emperor is rendered powerless and finally agrees to reopen the case. After investigating, he pronounces Prince Qi, Lin Xie, Lin Shu, and the entire Chiyan army innocent.

After accomplishing his mission, Mei Changsu hears news of Northern Wei forces taking advantage of the political unrest by invading Da Liang. He resolves to take up arms to drive off the Southern forces (Da Yu), as that is what Lin Shu would have done. Mei takes Lin Chen's medication, which gives himself strength for three months, so he can lead Liang forces to defeat the enemy. He ultimately does not return to the capital. Several years later, Prince Jing becomes the new Emperor. When Commander Meng Zhi requests for Emperor Jing to name the newly merged militia, he names it "Chang Lin" army, in honor of Lin Shu and Mei Chang Su.

Cast 

 Main cast

Hu Ge as Mei Changsu/Su Zhe/Lin Shu
Zhang Zhehan as teenage Lin Shu
Liu Tao as Princess Mu Nihuang
Pan Xiao Yang as teenage Nihuang
 Wang Kai as Xiao Jingyan, Prince Jing

 Jiang Zuo Alliance

Leo Wu as Fei Liu
 Zhou Qi Qi as Gong Yu
 Jin Dong as Lin Chen
 Wang Hong as Li Gang
 Zhao Yi Long as Zhen Ping
 Zhong Wei Hua as Physician Yan
 Wei Wei as Tong Lu
 Shan Ying Zhe as Nie Feng
 Li Shuai as Wei Zheng
 Liu Hong Yuan as Han Li
 Liu Hong Chao as An Rui
 Gong Fang Min as Sir Shisan

 Others

 Wang Ou as Qin Banruo
 Jin Feng as Junniang
 Wang Chen Yi Xian as Princess Xuanji
 Fu Tao as Lu Yuan
 Yan Jie as Zhuo Qingyao
 Liu Hao Ming as Zhuo Dingfeng
 Qiao Xin as Yuwen Nian
 Guo Dong Yue as Prince Yuwen Xuan
 Liu Shu Chen as Madam Zhuo
 Sun Meng Jia as Xiaoxin

 Liang Royal Family

 Victor Huang as Xiao Jinghuan, Prince Yu
 Liu Min Tao as Concubine Jing
 Ding Yong Dai as the Emperor
 Gao Xin as Xiao Jingxuan, Crown Prince Xian
 Zhang Yan Yan as Grand Princess Liyang
 Fang Xiao Li as Empress Yan
 Yang Yu Ting as Noble Consort Yue
 Ningwen Tong as Prince Ji
 Ji Chen as Xiao Jingyu, Prince Qi
 Zheng Yu Zhi as Grand Empress Dowager
 Lina Chen as Consort Hui

 Royal Court and nobles

 Chen Long as Meng Zhi
 Tan Xi He as Gao Zhan
 Zhang Ling Xin as Xia Dong
 Wang Yong Quan as Xia Jiang
 Wang Jinsong as Marquis Yan Que
 Cheng Hao Feng as Xiao Jingrui
 Guo Xiao Ran as Yan Yujin
 Liu Yijun  as Marquis Xie Yu
 Zhang Xiao Qian as Mu Qing
 Kuang Mu Ye as Xie Bi
 Sui Yu Meng as Xie Qi
 Zheng Sheng Li as General Lin Xie
 Feng Hui as Shen Zhui
 Lee Duo as Cai Quan
 Liu Guanlin as Xia Chun
 Sui Shuyang as Xia Qiu
 Zhang Yujian as Lie Zhanying
 Liu Yang as General Qi Meng
 Zhang Ju Ming as Xiao Tingsheng

Production

Background 
In April 2011, Shandong Television Media Group acquired the film adaption rights for the popular 2007 internet novel written by Hai Yan, Lang Ya Bang, which has been called the "Chinese version of The Count of Monte Cristo. Producer Hou Hongliang thought that the original novel conveyed the kind of emotion people are most attracted to, the characters' inner strength and revenge, and therefore decided to adapt the novel for television. The series' overall investment of the costume drama was more than one hundred million yuan, and the director and producer strived for majestic atmosphere with poetic, beautiful images.Director Kong Sheng and Hou Hongliang, who have been friends for 20 years, have worked together in The Age of Iron, Chuang Guandong, All Quiet in Peking, and The Line and other television productions. The original author, Hai Yan, said that she had no intention to make Lang Ya Bang into a television series, but Shandong producers encouraged her to do so, while also offering her the role as the drama's screenwriter, despite the fact that she had no such experience. The writing of the script lasted from mid-October 2012 to April 2013. Hai Yan stated that the story "will certainly be changed in details, but the framework, the characters and the plot is set to no major changes..., we are most concerned about the preservation of the outcome of Mei Changsu. I think, according to my personal standards, 80% of the script is original." Hou Hongliang said in earlier interviews that the series "highlights justice, patriotism and brotherhood".
Although it was not intended for any historical backstory corresponding to a certain dynasty, for the sake of the costumes, props and set designs, Nirvana in Fire was set during the Northern and Southern dynasties. Hou Hongliang stated that "characters will be relatively free flowing, in line with ancient individuals that are typically imagined."

Notable members of production include Sun Molong and Li Gang as directors of photography, Meng Ke as head composer, Jiang Guangtuo in charge of the dubbing, Liu Jie as the stunt director, Wang Huo, Su Zhiyong and Shao Changyong as the artistic designers, Ru Mei Qi as the fashion designer, Kong Gezi in charge of visual effects, and Liu Lei in charge of sound recordings.

The original Chinese title of the series means "The List from Langya", a list that gathers the most talented people of the fictional land in the story. The English title Nirvana in Fire was chosen to attract foreign viewers and reflects the main character Mei Changsu's suffering and his ultimate liberation "from an endless cycle of personal reincarnations".

Shooting 
It was announced in mid-December 2013 that Hu Ge, Victor Huang, Wang Kai and Chen Long would act as Mei Changsu, Prince Yu, Prince Jing and Meng Zhi in the drama. When the cast and crew were formally established, they officially started shooting on February 12, 2014 at Hengdian World Studios. The shooting was separated into three groups, shooting at Hengdian, Xiangshan Global Studios, western Zhejiang grasslands, Wuxi and others. Location shooting was finished in June 2014, and entered post-production.

Original soundtrack 

"When the Wind Blows (风起时)", sung by Hu Ge, is the main theme song of the drama, with "Faded Beauty (红颜旧)" and "Loyal Blood Forever Runs Red (赤血长殷)" acting as insert songs. The rest of the tracks are instrumental and performed by various artists. "When the Wind Blows" was composed by Meng Ke, with lyrics written by Hai Yan. "Faded Beauty" was composed by Zhao Jialin and written by Yuan Liang. "Loyal Blood Forever Runs Red" was composed by Yu Haihang and written by Qing Yan and Bing Feng.

"Ask the Sky (问天)" by Alfred Hui (许廷铿) and "Can Bear More (可以背负更多)" by Jinny Ng (吳若希) served as Nirvana in Fires Cantonese opening and ending songs during its TVB broadcast.

Reception

Critical response 
The series garnered critical acclaim, with many positive reviews and discussions surfacing on the internet through Weibo. It topped viewership ratings in fifty cities in China and enjoyed high audience ratings in Taiwan (average: 1.6%, highest: 2.52%). The drama is also immensely popular overseas and has been translated to and dubbed in different languages. On CJ E&M's cable channel China Television, the drama set a record of 1.8% (0.8% nationally) in the Seoul region.

People's Daily praised the production's attention to historical detail, from clothing to etiquette, and highlighted it as one of the reasons audiences could buy the premise. Week in China wrote that "the theme of correcting the wrongs of an emperor and pursuing justice for a faithful few clearly resonates with the viewers – especially given the ongoing debates in modern China about issues like the rule of law." The Straits Times called it an "accomplished hybrid of historical and idol drama", saying that the story puzzles the viewers until the veil falls off around episode 50 when "the excitement of discovery wears off".

Douban gave the drama 9.3 out of 10 from more than 435,000 user reviews, with the series being dubbed as "China's Game of Thrones" due to its popularity. As of February 2021, the rating on Douban has since risen to 9.4 with 530,958 reviews. Nirvana in Fire was included in SARFT's 2016 statement "Introduction to Good Dramas", as an example of "natural presentation" of Chinese heritage, with its success as evidence for Chinese culture's "great potential" in costume TV series.

On the other hand, the reception of the drama in Hong Kong was mixed, local TVB channel, which broadcast the series quite late, in May 2016, registered falling viewership ratings. Some viewers found it "boring" and "slow", while younger generations preferred to watch the episodes online, instead of waiting for the television broadcast, which can also explain the lower viewership ratings. Fans of the show were dissatisfied with the Cantonese dubbing, the changing of the opening and closing songs, as well as the station's decision to cut the series down to 47 episodes in total. Industry experts also theoretized that Hong Kong audience may have been unfamiliar with this style of drama, and the actors were not as well known to them, either.

Cultural impact 
Certain scenic spots in China have also been changed to Langya Ge (Langya Hall) to attract tourists. Although Anhui, Jiangsu and Shandong province all claim to be where the drama is set, Hai Yan clarified that the setting was fictitious. Due to its popularity in Korea, Tourbucket launched a "Lang Ya Bang" tour of the drama's film location. Fans reportedly wore Mei Changsu's signature cloak during the tour. The publications for the web novel was highly anticipated, with the number of pre-orders reaching new highs. At the 2015 Big Data Index of Culture and Entertainment Industry Conference, the character, Mei Changsu, was named the year's "most talked-about television character (online)". The success of the adaption ushered in the original book's sales increase by more than 3,300 percent on Amazon.

Ratings 
 Highest ratings are marked in red, lowest ratings are marked in blue

Awards and nominations

International broadcast 

The series is also available on streaming platform Viki.com, subtitled in English, Spanish, French, Romanian and Hungarian, among other languages.

References

External links 
 Nirvana in Fire on Weibo 
 Nirvana in Fire on Sina.com 
 

 
2015 Chinese television series debuts
2015 Chinese television series endings
Beijing Television original programming
Chinese historical television series
Dragon Television original programming
Television series about China
Television series by Daylight Entertainment
Television series set in the Northern and Southern dynasties
Television shows based on Chinese novels